Wiggle or wiggles may refer to:

Art, entertainment, and media

Literature
Wiggle (book), a children's book by Doreen Cronin and Scott Menchin

Music

Groups
Wiggle, a UK DJ duo formed by Nathan Coles and Terry Francis
The Wiggles, an Australian children's band

Albums and EPs
The Wiggles (album), 1991 debut album by The Wiggles
Wiggle (album), 1993, by Screeching Weasel
The Wiggle, a 2004 techno EP by Dave Clarke

Songs
"Wiggle" (song), 2014, by Jason Derulo
"That Wiggle", a 1977 song by Syl Johnson
"The Wiggle", a 1960 song by Sandy Nelson
"The Wiggle", by Earl Klugh from Sudden Burst of Energy 1996
"The Wiggle", by Mother Superior from The Heavy Soul Experience 1996
"The Wiggle", by Father MC from Sex Is Law 1993

Business
Wiggle Ltd, an online sporting goods retailer

Other uses
The Wiggle, a bike route in San Francisco
WGL (software), a Microsoft Windows graphics programming interface, pronounced "wiggle"

See also
Wiggle matching, an archeological dating method
Wiggle stereoscopy, a 3-D image display method
"Wiggle It", a dance-pop-disco song by Australian singer Ricki-Lee
Wiggle Wiggle (disambiguation)